Perebendya is a poem by Taras Shevchenko about the blind itinerant Ukrainian bard (Kobzar).

The poem is dated as written in approximately 1839 in Saint Peterburg. The first known publication of this poem, originally dedicated to Yevhen Hrebinka, is considered the 1840 Kobzar (also in Saint Peterburg), the first edition of this Shevchenko's best known poetry collection. The poem was published again in the 1844 edition of Kobzar without the dedication to Hrebinka and with some orthographic changes. The same year the poem was published in the Polish transliteration in the collection «Wirszy T. Szewczenka» (the publication contained one grammatical error in declension.)

When, after his return from the exile, Shevchenko was preparing the publication "Poetry by Shevchenko. Volume 1" he reworked the text again and renamed the poem to "Kobzar". The new publication of the volume encountered the difficulties with the censorship office that only granted the permission to reprint the previously published collection. Therefore, the compromise version of the poem was published in 1860 with only some of the poet's corrections being included.

When the publication was in print, Shevchenko made several more changes. The manuscript reveals that he restored the original name while not crossing out the new one as well as several other changes.

Ivan Yizhakevych has a painting with the same name based on the same poem by Taras Shevchenko.

See also

 Izbornyk
 List of Ukrainian-language poets
 List of Ukrainian-language writers
 Ukrainian literature

References 
Taras Shevchenko. "Zibrannia tvoriv u shesty tomah", Naukova Dumka, Kiev, 2003. T. 1 Poeziya 1837-1847, С. 110-112; С. 617-620. (with editor's notes)

Ukrainian-language books
Ukrainian literature
Ukrainian art
Taras Shevchenko
1839 poems